Reinardt Janse van Rensburg (born 3 February 1989) is a South African professional road bicycle racer, who rides for the Denver Disruptors. He previously rode for Dutch UCI ProTeam . He is not related to fellow professional cyclist and former teammate Jacques Janse van Rensburg.

Career

Janse van Rensburg left  at the end of the 2012 season, and joined  for the 2013 season. Subsequently, it was announced that he would be rejoining  for 2015. He was named in the start list for the 2015 Tour de France and the start list for the 2016 Tour de France.

Major results

2007
 2nd Time trial, National Junior Road Championships
2009
 African Road Championships
1st  Team time trial
2nd  Time trial
9th Road race
2010
 National Under-23 Road Championships
1st  Time trial
3rd Road race
 African Road Championships
2nd  Time trial
7th Road race
 3rd Overall Tour of Rwanda
1st Stage 1
 6th Overall Tour du Maroc
2011
 All-Africa Games
1st  Time trial
1st  Team time trial
3rd  Road race
 1st Stage 2 Tour du Maroc
 African Road Championships
2nd  Team time trial
3rd  Road race
3rd  Time trial
 2nd Overall Tour of Hainan
 4th Overall Herald Sun Tour
1st Stage 2
 6th Overall La Tropicale Amissa Bongo
 6th Overall Tour of Azerbaijan (Iran)
2012
 National Road Championships
1st  Time trial
2nd Road race
 1st  Overall Tour du Maroc
1st Points classification
1st Stages 1, 5, 6 & 8
 1st  Overall Tour de Bretagne
1st Stage 4
 1st  Overall Ronde van Overijssel
1st Prologue
 1st Circuit de Wallonie
 1st Ronde van Zeeland Seaports
 1st Cape Argus Cycle Race
 1st 947 Cycle Challenge
 Volta a Portugal
1st  Points classification
1st Prologue & Stage 10
 4th Overall Tour de Gironde
1st Points classification
 4th Ronde van Noord-Holland
 6th Duo Normand (with Jaco Venter)
 10th Overall Flèche du Sud
1st Points classification
2013
 1st Binche–Chimay–Binche
 2nd Clásica de Almería
 3rd Nationale Sluitingsprijs
2014
 5th Grand Prix d'Isbergues
2015
 African Road Championships
2nd  Team time trial
3rd  Time trial
4th Road race
 National Road Championships
2nd Time trial
4th Road race
2016
 1st  Overall Tour de Langkawi
 National Road Championships
3rd Road race
3rd Time trial
2017
 National Road Championships
1st  Road race
3rd Time trial
 5th Grand Prix of Aargau Canton
 7th Scheldeprijs
 9th Overall Dubai Tour
2018
 7th Overall Deutschland Tour
 7th Tour de l'Eurométropole
2019
 3rd Grand Prix of Aargau Canton
 4th Road race, National Road Championships
2020
 7th Grand Prix d'Isbergues
2021
 4th Trofeo Alcudia – Port d'Alcudia
 4th Ronde van Limburg
 9th Eurométropole Tour
2022
 National Road Championships
1st  Road race
5th Time trial
 2nd  Team time trial African Road Championships
 8th Grand Prix d'Isbergues
2023
 2nd Road race, National Road Championships

Grand Tour general classification results timeline

References

External links

MTN Qhubeka profile

1989 births
Living people
People from Matjhabeng Local Municipality
White South African people
South African male cyclists
African Games gold medalists for South Africa
African Games medalists in cycling
African Games bronze medalists for South Africa
Competitors at the 2011 All-Africa Games